is a Japanese gymnast. She competed at the 1968 Summer Olympics and the 1972 Summer Olympics.

References

1950 births
Living people
Japanese female artistic gymnasts
Olympic gymnasts of Japan
Gymnasts at the 1968 Summer Olympics
Gymnasts at the 1972 Summer Olympics
Sportspeople from Fukui Prefecture
Asian Games medalists in gymnastics
Gymnasts at the 1974 Asian Games
Asian Games bronze medalists for Japan
Medalists at the 1974 Asian Games
20th-century Japanese women
21st-century Japanese women